Telepaís is a news program produced by Colombia's Jorge Barón Televisión and aired on Canal Uno. It debuted in 2004. The show is directed by Alejandro Nieto and hosted by Jorge Barón, Alberto Gómez, María Carolina López and Juan Gómez Barón. Until his death on 31 December 2008, the director of the program was Julio Nieto Bernal.

External links 
 Official website 

Colombian television news shows
2004 Colombian television series debuts
2010s Colombian television series
2000s Colombian television series